Identical Twins, Roselle, New Jersey, 1967 is a noted photograph by photographer Diane Arbus from the United States.

History
Diane Arbus was known for her photographs of outsiders and people on the fringes of society. She often shot with a Rolleiflex medium format twin-lens reflex that provided a square aspect ratio and a waist-level viewfinder. The viewfinder allowed Arbus to connect with her subjects in ways that a standard eye-level viewfinder did not.

Significance
Identical Twins depicts two young twin sisters, Cathleen and Colleen Wade, standing side by side in matching corduroy dresses, white tights, and white headbands in their dark hair. Both stare into the camera, one slightly smiles and the other slightly frowns. The photo has been said to sum up Arbus’ vision. Biographer Patricia Bosworth said, "She was involved in the question of identity. Who am I and who are you? The twin image expresses the crux of that vision: normality in freakishness and the freakishness in normality." Arbus' inquiry into identity reaches a climax in this photograph with the noticeable tension between the girls' being twins and individuals at the same time. Their extreme closeness, the uniformity of their clothing and haircut underline their close bond while the facial expressions strongly emphasise their individuality.

The twins were seven years old when Arbus spotted them at a Christmas party for twins and triplets. The twins' father once said about the photo, "We thought it was the worst likeness of the twins we'd ever seen."

In popular culture
The photo has also inspired other art. Most notably, it is said to be echoed in Stanley Kubrick's horror film The Shining (1980), which features sisters in similar dress and pose.  It is also briefly referenced in Harmony Korine's Gummo and in an episode of the television series Psych: "The Old and The Restless". It also appears in A Simple Favor, a
novel by Darcey Bell, where it hangs above the mantel in one of the main characters' home. 

In 2004, a print of the photo was sold at Sotheby's in New York for $478,000. It is also one of a set of recreated iconic portraits through photographic history by the photographer Sandro Miller using John Malkovich as the actor in each portrait.

See also 
 Child with Toy Hand Grenade in Central Park

References

External links
Diane Arbus: Revelations exhibition, Victoria and Albert Museum, London, 13 October 2005 — 15 January 2006

1967 photographs
1967 in art
Black-and-white photographs
Photographs of the United States
Identical twins
Roselle, New Jersey